Golden Greats may refer to:

Golden Greats, an album by Charlie Pride
Cher's Golden Greats, a compilation album by American singer Cher
Golden Greats, an album by Gary Glitter
Golden Greats, an album by Golden Earring
Golden Greats (Ian Brown album), second solo album by Ian Brown, the ex-frontman of The Stone Roses
Golden Greats, an album by Kenny Rogers
The Golden Greats, Sweet 1977
Golden Greats, an album by The Ventures

See also
20 Golden Greats (disambiguation)
40 Golden Greats (disambiguation)